"Dekinai" (""; "") is Olivia Lufkin's 5th solo single released on July 26, 2000. There were two promotional versions of this single released: a cd version and a vinyl version. The vinyl record version contains one extra remix of "Pass me the sugar" in place of "Escape the Flames". The song features Kochi Korenaga and Luna Sea drummer Shinya Yamada.

The music video and single cover were shot together in mid-June 2000 in Tokyo, by the same director.

Track listing

Compact Disc
"Dekinai"
"Escape the Flames"
"Slow-mo"
"Dekinai" (Down to the Floor Mix)
"Pass me the sugar" (Heat in the Beat Mix)
"Dekinai"(instrumental version)

12"
A-side
"Dekinai" (Down to Floor Mix)
"Dekinai"

B-side
"Pass me the sugar" (afterours mix)
"Pass me the sugar" (Heat in Beat Mix)
"Slow-mo"

References 

2000 singles
Olivia Lufkin songs
2000 songs
Avex Trax singles